"Too Dear!" is a short story by Russian author Leo Tolstoy first published in 1897.  It is a humorous account of the troubles of dealing with a criminal in the kingdom of Monaco.

See also

Bibliography of Leo Tolstoy
Twenty-Three Tales
Capital punishment in Monaco

References the theme on the story of Too Dear

"The Works of Tolstoi."  Black's Readers Service Company: Roslyn, New York.  1928.

External links

 Complete Text Online, as translated by Louise Maude and Aylmer Maude
 "Too Expensive", from RevoltLib.com
 "Too Expensive", from Marxists.org

Other Online Versions

1897 short stories
Short stories by Leo Tolstoy